The yellow-billed kite (Milvus aegyptius) is the Afrotropic counterpart of the black kite (Milvus migrans), of which it is most often considered a subspecies. However, DNA studies suggest that the yellow-billed kite differs significantly from black kites in the Eurasian clade, and should be considered as a separate, allopatric species.

Taxonomy
The yellow-billed kite was formally described in 1788 by the German naturalist Johann Friedrich Gmelin in his revised and expanded edition of Carl Linnaeus's Systema Naturae. He specified that the bird was found in Egypt, placed it with the eagles, falcons and relatives in the genus Falco and coined the binomial name Falco aegyptius. Unusually Gmelin did not cite a source for his information. The yellow-billed kite is now one of three kites placed in the genus Milvus that was introduced in 1799 by the French naturalist Bernard Germain de Lacépède.

There are two subspecies: M. a. parasitus (Daudin, 1800) , found throughout most of sub-Saharan Africa (including Madagascar), except for the Congo Basin (with intra-African migrations) and M. a. aegyptius (Gmelin, JF, 1788) of Egypt, south-west Arabia and the Horn of Africa (which disperses south during the non-breeding season).

The yellow-billed kite was formerly considered as conspecific with the black kite (Milvus migrans). A molecular phylogenetic study published in 2005 compared DNA sequences of two mitochondrial loci of the red, black and yellow-billed kites. It found that there was significant divergence between the three species, but unexpectedly, the two clades corresponding to the M. a. aegyptius and  M. a. parasitus subspecies did not form a monophyletic group.

Description
As suggested by its name, the yellow-billed kite is easily recognized by its entirely yellow bill, unlike that of the black kite (which is present in Africa as a visitor during the North Hemisphere winter). However, immature yellow-billed kites resemble the black kites of the corresponding age.

Habitat and feeding
They are found in almost all habitats, including parks in suburbia, but rare in the arid Namib and Karoo. They feed on a wide range of small vertebrates and insects, much of which is scavenged.

Status
It is mostly an intra-African breeding migrant, present in Southern Africa July–March and sometimes as late as May. It is generally common. There are no threats to this species as stated by the IUCN.

Gallery

References

External links

 Yellow-billed kite - Species text in The Atlas of Southern African Birds

yellow-billed kite
Birds of prey of Africa
yellow-billed kite
yellow-billed kite